"Happy" is the tenth track on the Rolling Stones' 1972 album Exile on Main St. and features Keith Richards on lead vocals.  Released as the second single from the album in July 1972, "Happy" entered the Billboard Hot 100 at No. 69 on 15 July 1972 and reached No. 22 on 19 August 1972.

Overview
Credited to Jagger/Richards, "Happy" was written primarily by Keith Richards during the summer of 1971, at the villa Nellcôte in southern France, over the course of a single afternoon. According to Richards, "We did that in an afternoon, in only four hours, cut and done. At noon it had never existed. At four o'clock it was on tape." The basic tracks were recorded in the Nellcôte basement, using the Rolling Stones Mobile Studio, with Richards on bass, guitar and vocals, producer Jimmy Miller on drums, and saxophonist Bobby Keys on maracas.

"Happy" was the only single by the band to chart on the Hot 100 on which Richards sang lead.

In concert
Since 1972, Richards has often sung "Happy" in concert and it has become one of his signature tunes. Performances of the song through 1978 also featured Jagger's vocals during the chorus.

Concert renditions of the song appear on the albums Love You Live and Live Licks; the studio track has been released on the compilation albums Made in the Shade, Forty Licks and GRRR! The song also features on concert films and DVD box sets: Ladies and Gentlemen: The Rolling Stones (1974), Live at the Tokyo Dome (1990), Stones at the Max (1992), Four Flicks (2004), The Biggest Bang (2007), Some Girls: Live in Texas '78 (2011), Sweet Summer Sun: Hyde Park Live (2013) and L.A. Forum – Live In 1975 (2014).

Personnel

According to authors Philippe Margotin and Jean-Michel Guesdon:

The Rolling Stones
 Keith Richards lead vocals, backing vocals, lead and rhythm guitars, bass
 Mick Jagger backing vocals, tambourine

Additional musicians
 Bobby Keys baritone saxophone
 Jim Price trumpet, trombone
 Jimmy Miller drums

Cover versions
Spirit on the album Spirit of '76
The Pointer Sisters on the album Priority
Nils Lofgren on his 1977 album I Came to Dance
 Southside Johnny on his album Into the Harbour
The Replacements (band) live on tour in 1987
Sheryl Crow on the live album Sheryl Crow and Friends: Live from Central Park in 1999, featuring Keith Richards
The Black Crowes live on tour in 2005
Elvis Costello live on tour in 2009/2010.
Lucinda Williams live 2009

See also
The Rolling Stones discography

Notes

References

Sources

 

The Rolling Stones songs
1972 singles
Songs written by Jagger–Richards
Song recordings produced by Jimmy Miller
1972 songs